Echo Place is a community in Brantford, Ontario. Incorporated in 1865 east of Brantford, it was built around Springbrook Hotel.  

The 1891 census found a population of 30, including three businesses: A general store/post office, a nursery and an oatmeal mill.

In 1955 it was amalgamated into Brantford.

References

External links 
Agricultural profile of Echo Place, 2006 Canadian Census

Brantford